The Frauen DFB-Pokal 1984–85 was the 5th season of the cup competition, Germany's second-most important title in women's football. In the final which was held in Berlin on 26 May 1985 FSV Frankfurt defeated KBC Duisburg 4–3 on penalties. The game had previously ended 1–1 after extra time. FSV Frankfurt thus won their first national title.

Participants

First round

Quarter-finals

Semi-finals

Final 

For the first time the cup final was held in Berlin prior to the DFB-Pokal final of the men's competition. The cup final has since been held twenty-five consecutive times in Berlin and will only in 2010 be moved to Cologne.

See also 

 1984–85 DFB-Pokal men's competition

References 

Fra
DFB-Pokal Frauen seasons